Sunken Gardens is a historic public park and garden complex located at Huntington, Huntington County, Indiana. It was designed by the Chicago Landscape Co. in 1923, and completed in 1929.  The gardens include outcropped limestone walls on all sides, a horseshoe shaped pool, limestone foot bridges, two levels, and an automobile-related fieldstone bridge.

It was listed on the National Register of Historic Places in 1997.

See also
List of botanical gardens and arboretums in Indiana

References

Parks on the National Register of Historic Places in Indiana
1929 establishments in Indiana
Buildings and structures in Huntington County, Indiana
National Register of Historic Places in Huntington County, Indiana
Gardens in Indiana